The 1975 European Junior Badminton Championships was the fourth edition of the European Junior Badminton Championships. It was held in Copenhagen, Denmark, in the month of April. Danish players won three titles, the Girls' singles, Girls' doubles and mixed team championships while England won Mixed doubles, and Sweden won Boys' singles and Boys' doubles disciplines.

Medalists

Results

Semi-finals

Finals

Medal table

References 

European Junior Badminton Championships
European Junior Badminton Championships
European Junior Badminton Championships
European Junior Badminton Championships
International sports competitions hosted by Denmark